Karacan is a Turkish surname. Notable people with the surname include:

 Ali Naci Karacan (1896–1955), Turkish journalist and publisher
 Jem Karacan (born 1989), Turkish footballer

See also
 Karaçan, Karakoçan

Turkish-language surnames